KUCI (88.9 FM) is a college radio station broadcasting a variety format. Licensed to Irvine, California, United States, the station serves the Orange County area.  The station is currently owned by Regents of the University of California and is based out of the system's Irvine campus.

KUCI's studios are located by the Science Library and the Arts Computation Engineering Facility and remains the only independent radio station in Orange County.

Background
Originally a student-run pirate radio station in 1968 only reaching a few miles from the UCI campus, KUCI broadcast taped music from a dormitory on campus.  The tapes were made by Richard Privette, and the broadcast equipment was assembled by an engineering student named Craig Will.  Shortly after, there was a nightly live music and talk show called Unreal Radio, with Lee Sailer and Zack Zenor, from Sailer's dormitory room.

KUCI became legal after it was forced to officially register with the Federal Communications Commission (FCC) following a crack-down on illegal radio broadcasts in 1969. The legalization of the station was undertaken by Craig Will. 1969 was the first year that KUCI received funding from the Associated Students of UCI (ASUCI), which filed an application to register the station with the Federal Communications Commission. Will, unable to continue the process due to a wound from radiation testing and under the burden of his schoolwork, handed the project to Earl Arbuckle, who continued the work.

On October 16, 1969, the FCC granted KUCI Program Test Authority to broadcast on 89.9 MHz. The studio at the time was inside a small closet in the Physical Science Building. Evening-only broadcasts featured records from the disc jockey's own collection. The first song ever played on KUCI was "Sugar, Sugar" by the Archies.

In the spring of 1971, construction began on the third floor of UCI's Gateway Commons for studio and office space. By the fall of 1971, KUCI moved for the first time. At this time, the station's music library consisted of 400 records. In January 1975, KUCI's management decided to establish a 24-hour schedule.

In 1981, KCRW, a station sharing the same frequency as KUCI, received permission from the FCC to relocate their antenna and boost their power. KUCI's signal was dampened to a few hundred yards. KUCI quickly applied for a new frequency, but the government lost the paperwork.  After protests and petitions by staff, students, and community members, KUCI received permission to change their frequency to 88.9 fm, where it continues to broadcast.  It shares this frequency with another low-power college station, KXLU, which broadcasts from Loyola Marymount University in West Los Angeles, California.

Almost ten years later and after the filing of many applications, KUCI acquired the right to raise the power from 25 watts mono. On April 23, 1993, KUCI became a 200-watt stereo station and played "Sugar, Sugar" again to celebrate the event. In 1993, UC Irvine's management was ready to tear down Gateway Common's walls for earthquake retrofitting. In the summer of 1994, KUCI moved its entire operations to the temporary building called Humanities Annex, home to the Center for Gender Education.

KUCI has benefited from its proximity to the Los Angeles music scene, with notable performances and visits from many up-and-coming artists such as X, Red Hot Chili Peppers, No Doubt, Social Distortion, Jack Johnson, and the Dead Milkmen.

KUCI airs an extensive schedule of the UC Irvine Anteaters, including all of the men's basketball games and most of the women's basketball and baseball games.

References

External links 

 

UCI
University of California, Irvine
Mass media in Orange County, California
UCI
Former pirate radio stations
Radio stations established in 1968